The following lists events that happened during 1862 in South Africa.

Incumbents
 Governor of the Cape of Good Hope and High Commissioner for Southern Africa:
 Sir Robert Wynyard (acting until 14 January).
 Sir Philip Wodehouse (from 15 January).
 Lieutenant-governor of the Colony of Natal: John Scott.
 State President of the Orange Free State: Marthinus Wessel Pretorius.
 President of the Executive Council of the South African Republic:
 Stephanus Schoeman (acting until 17 April).
 Willem Cornelis Janse van Rensburg (acting from 18 April).

Events
January
 15 – Sir Philip Wodehouse becomes Governor of the Cape of Good Hope and High Commissioner for Southern Africa.

April
 18 – W.C. Janse van Rensburg becomes acting President of the Executive Council of the South African Republic.

October
 2 – A breakwater construction locomotive for Table Bay Harbour arrives on the ship Navarino.
 9 – The Transvaal Civil War breaks out following Stephanus Schoeman's unconstitutional ousting of the acting President of the Executive Council of the South African Republic on 6 December 1860.

Unknown date
 Standard Bank of British South Africa Limited is established in London.

Railways

Railway lines opened
 1 May – Cape Western – Cape Town to Stellenbosch, .

Locomotives
 The Table Bay Harbour Board acquires a single broad-gauge locomotive, builder or appearance unknown, for excavation and breakwater construction work.

Births
 24 July - Percy FitzPatrick, author, politician, mining financier and fruit industry pioneer. (d. 1931)
 27 September – Louis Botha, Boer general and politician. (d. 1919)

References

South Africa
Years in South Africa
History of South Africa